The Apón River is a river of Venezuela. It drains into Lake Maracaibo.

The Apón River rises in the Serranía del Perijá.
In its lower reaches it flows through an area of the Catatumbo moist forests ecoregion.

See also
List of rivers of Venezuela

References

Rivers of Venezuela